The Torneo Grita México Clausura 2022 (stylized as Grita... México C22) Liga MX final phase was played between 7 May and 29 May 2022. A total of twelve teams competed in the final phase to decide the champions of the Clausura 2022 Liga MX season. For the fourth straight season, an additional qualifying round, the reclassification or repechaje, was employed, which expanded the number of playoff spots to 12.

Both finalists qualified to the 2023 CONCACAF Champions League.

Atlas defeated Pachuca 3–2 on aggregate to win their second straight title and third overall. As winners of both the Apertura 2021 and Clausura 2022 seasons, Atlas were automatically awarded the 2022 Campeón de Campeones.

Qualified teams
The following teams qualified for the championship stage.

In the following tables, the number of appearances, last appearance, and previous best result count only those in the short tournament era starting from Invierno 1996 (not counting those in the long tournament era from 1943–44 to 1995–96).

Format

Reclassification
All rounds were played in a single game hosted by the higher seed
If a game ended in a draw, it proceeded directly to a penalty shoot-out.

Liguilla
Teams were be re-seeded each round.
The winners of the Reclassification matches were seeded based on their ranking in the classification table.
Team with more goals on aggregate after two matches advanced.
No away goals rule is applied in neither round; if the two teams were tied on aggregate, the higher-seeded team advanced.
In the final, if the two teams were tied after both legs, the match would go to extra time and, if necessary, a shoot-out.
Both finalists qualified to the 2023 CONCACAF Champions League.

Reclassification

Summary
Matches took place on 7–8 May 2022.

|}

Matches

Seeding
The following is the final seeding for the final phase. The winners of the Reclassification matches were seeded based on their position in the classification table.

Bracket

Quarter-finals
The first legs were played on 11–12 May, and the second legs were played on 14–15  May.

|}

First leg

Second leg

América won 4–3 on aggregate.

Pachuca won 5–4 on aggregate.

Atlas won 3–2 on aggregate.

1–1 on aggregate. UANL advanced due to being the higher seeded team in the classification table.

Semi-finals
The first legs were played on 18–19 May, and the second legs were played on 21–22 May.

|}

First leg

Second leg

Atlas won 5–0 on aggregate. UANL originally won the second leg 4–2, however, the club had nine foreign players on the field (clubs are only allowed a maximum of eight), thus, UANL's four goals were annulled.

Pachuca won 4–1 on aggregate.

Finals
The first leg was played on 26 May, and the second leg was played on 29 May.

|}

First leg

Details

Statistics

Second leg

Atlas won 3–2 on aggregate.

Details

Statistics

Statistics

Goalscorers

Assists

References

 
2
Liga MX seasons